Manso is a small town located about 30 km from the port city of Takoradi, in the Western Region of Ghana. It is the capital of the Amenfi Central district.

Namesake 
There are a number of villages in Ghana sharing the same name.

Transport 
Manso lies on the western network of the Ghana Railway Corporation and is at the end of double track from Takoradi.

See also 
 Transport in Ghana
 Railway stations in Ghana

References 

Populated places in the Western Region (Ghana)